The 2022 season was the 102nd season in the history of Perak and their 1st season in the Malaysia Premier League. The club are participating in the Malaysia Premier League and Malaysia FA Cup.

On 26 February 2022, the club announced players for the 2022 season.

Players

Squad

Transfers in
Mid-season

Transfers out
Mid-season

Competitions

Malaysia Premier League

Malaysia FA Cup

Statistics

Appearances and goals

|-
|colspan="14"|Players sold or loaned out after the start of the season:
|-

References

Perak